Higham is a small village in Derbyshire, England. It is on the B6013 and A61 roads. Nearby settlements include Shirland, Stretton, Alfreton and Clay Cross. It is in the civil parish of Shirland and Higham.  The name Higham is of Saxon origin.

The village has two public houses, the Crown Inn and the Greyhound. It does not have a church of its own, sharing St Leonard's church with neighbouring Shirland.

See also
Listed buildings in Shirland and Higham

External links

 Higham at DerbyshireUK

Villages in Derbyshire
Towns and villages of the Peak District
North East Derbyshire District